Doris Lockness (February 2, 1910 – January 30, 2017) was a pioneering American aviator.

Biography
Lockness was born in Pennsylvania in 1910 and began flying in 1939 and worked as a liaison engineer at Douglas Aircraft Company.

She left in 1943 to join the Women Airforce Service Pilots. After the war she continued in aviation, working as a flight instructor and performing at air shows.

Lockness died in 2017, three days before her 107th birthday.

In 1997, a biography of Lockness was included in a “Women and Flight” exhibition at the National Air and Space Museum.

Awards
 In 1996, Lockness was awarded a Whirly Girls Livingston Award
 In 1997, she was awarded the NAA's Katharine Wright Memorial Trophy.

References

1910 births
2017 deaths
American centenarians
Women Airforce Service Pilots personnel
Place of birth missing
Place of death missing
Women centenarians
American women flight instructors
21st-century American women